Seconds Out Round One was compilation album of session tracks recorded in 1991 for the Mark Radcliffe radio show Hit The North, released by Imaginary Records. The album consisted of three tracks each from The Boo Radleys, Scorpio Rising, Dr. Phibes and the House of Wax Equations and Leatherface.

Track listing 
  	Scorpio Rising - "Freedom No 5"
 	Scorpio Rising - "Freedom 13"
 	Scorpio Rising - "Peace Frog"
 	Leatherface - "Not Superstitious"
 	Leatherface - "One to Say"
	Leatherface - "Discipline"
 	Dr Phibes & the House of Wax Equations - "Mr Fantasy"
 	Dr Phibes & the House of Wax Equations - "Mirrors"
 	Dr Phibes & the House of Wax Equations - "Burning Cross"
 	The Boo Radleys - "Naomi"
 	The Boo Radleys - "Skyscraper"
      The Boo Radleys - "Song For Up"

Catalogue number ILLCD 034.

1991 compilation albums
Imaginary Records compilation albums
Rock compilation albums